Corruption in Albania is a very serious problem. According to Global Corruption Barometer 2013, 66% of respondents indicated that level of corruption has increased in Albania.

Transparency International's Corruption Perceptions Index scores 180 countries according to the perceived corruption of the public sector and then ranks those countries by their score. In 2022, Albania scored 36 on a scale from 0 ("highly corrupt") to 100 ("very clean"). When ranked by score, Albania ranked 101st among the 180 countries in the Index, where the country ranked first is perceived to have the most honest public sector.  For comparison, the best score was 90 (ranked 1), and the worst score was 12 (ranked 180).

Corruption is still considered one of the most problematic factors for establishing business in Albania.  Even though anti-corruption legal framework of Albania is moderate, its enforcement is weak and corruption conviction rates are still very low.

Corruption and Human Development in Albania
After 1990, Albania has passed from a centralized economy to a liberal one. Liberalization has brought both mainly negative effects to the politics, economy and other social aspect. There are two main components that measure a country's progress toward success. Firstly, the economic growth is the most used and discussed indicator of the progress. During the last two decades the economists have been more interested in the economic development, consisting of the aggregate of health, education level and income rather than economic growth. Secondly, the corruption level is found to be a significant component of progress. Different researches have founded out a negative relationship between corruption level and countries’ progress. Empirical research of Hysa (2011) reveals that there is a statistically significant negative relationship between corruption indexes and human development. Empirical evidence of the study, comparing Albania with the EU member countries, suggests that more corrupted countries tend to have lower levels of human development. In the Albanian case, the relationship between corruption and human development is found to be much stronger than in the EU countries.

See also
 Corruption in Kosovo
 International Anti-Corruption Academy
 Group of States Against Corruption
 International Anti-Corruption Day
 ISO 37001 Anti-bribery management systems
 United Nations Convention against Corruption
 OECD Anti-Bribery Convention
 Transparency International

References 

Politics of Albania
Albania
Albania